Hovea lanceolata is a flowering plant in the  family Fabaceae. It is a small shrub with elliptic leaves and purple pea flowers. It grows in New South Wales and Queensland.

Description
The upper surface of the leaves is either green and shiny or greyish and dull, lower leaf surface with coiled grey-brown hairs. At the base of the leaf there are narrow-ovate to lance shaped stipules 1.0–3.2 mm (0.039–0.126 in) long, often tapering gradually to a point at the apex.

Taxonomy and naming
Hovea lanceolata was first formally described in 1814 by John Sims and the description was published in the Botanical Magazine. The specific epithet (lanceolata) is in reference to the leaves.

Distribution and habitat
This hovea grows in loam, shaly and shallow soils in forests and woodland in  Queensland and north-eastern New South Wales  to Cowra.

References

lanceolata
Flora of New South Wales
Flora of Queensland
Taxa named by John Sims (taxonomist)
Plants described in 1814